Kluang (Jawi: كلواڠ), formerly Keluang, is a town in Kluang District, Johor, Malaysia. Kluang was founded in 1915 as the administrative capital of central Johor by the British. It is located in the centre of the state and is within 90 minutes of all major urban areas of Johor. Kluang, combined with Batu Pahat, encompasses central Johor with a market catchment of over 700,000. Over the 20th century, Kluang's economy transitioned from rubber to palm oil and now has some of Malaysia's largest organic farms. The industrial sector has also grown significantly with multinational investment and a critical mass of tile manufacturers enabling the district to be called the 'tile capital of Malaysia'. The organic farming sector has also boosted Kluang as an ecotourism destination with key farms such as Zenxin, UK Agro and Kahang Organic Rice Farm.

History 
The name Kluang derives from the Malay word 'keluang' which means a type of flying fox or rather a type of fruit bat, which used to be plentiful in the district decades ago. They have almost completely disappeared due to the combination of hunting and destruction of their natural habitat (deforestation).

Kluang was founded in 1915 as the administrative capital for central Johor by the British. The main railway line linking north to south Malaya was built passing through Kluang and this helped in its growth. Roads were built to link Kluang to Johor Bahru towards the south-east, to Batu Pahat towards the south-west and to Mersing towards the north-east.

During World War II, the town of Kluang was occupied by Japanese forces on the 25th of January 1942 as they advance southwards as it was abandoned by Allied forces withdrawing towards Singapore. General Yamashita moved his headquarters forward from Kuala Lumpur to Kluang on 27 January 1942 as he advanced southwards. The Japanese later used the airfield in Kluang to launch air attacks on targets ranging from Singapore to Sumatra.

In the mid-fifties the airfield was used for spotter planes and helicopters searching for communists who were encamped in the Bukit Lambak area and as an artillery base.  It served as a  base for the Kluang Flying Club which used old Tiger Moth biplanes. Communists were largely driven out of the area in the six months leading up to Merdeka in 1957. The area around the airfield was a substantial army garrison with many different units and a large hospital. The 75 Workshop was an aviation united based in Kluang from 1946 to 1970. The veteran's group continues to hold reunions throughout the world.

There was a very big flood in Kluang in 1969. The river overflowed by 7 to 10 feet and much damage was caused to property. The fast waters of the flood broke down the front and back walls of the perimeter fence.

Today, the Malaysian Army maintains military camps in Kluang at Kem Batu Tiga and Kem Mahkota, which hosts the Malaysian Army Aviation Unit, 881 Squadron.

Geography 

Kluang is located in the centre of Johor. As it is located in the centre of the state, most major urban areas in Johor state are within 90 minutes drive time distance.

Kluang town lies in an area of undulating hills. The highest point is Gunung Lambak, a 510m tall mountain and one of the southernmost mountains in the Malaysian main range which lies not far from the town. In the eastern part of the district lies the Gunung Belumut Recreational Forest.

Kluang is landlocked and has no seafront. The Mengkibol River runs through the centre of the town while the Melantai River runs through the eastern part and the Sembrong River runs through the western part.

Urban sprawl in Kluang over the last three decades from the 1970s to 2000 has seen Kluang expand in a horizontal fashion, roughly along the major roads leading west to east. The town centre itself has more than tripled in size in terms of the number and land area occupied by commercial and retail buildings in that time. Many acres of rubber and oil palm plantations have been re-developed into housing estates.

Demographics
As of 2010, total population of Kluang District was 319,629 people. In 2000, the population growth was 1.48%.

Agriculture 
Since 1915 when Kluang was founded, the area initially grew as a rubber planting place. There are vast areas planted with rubber in the early days under the Guthrie Ropel Group, Asiatic Plantations, Harrisons & Crossfield and various other rubber companies. An innovation was the process of vacuum evaporation of rubber latex by the Revertex company. Planters established the Kluang Club which is still thriving as the Kluang Country Club. Notable rubber plantations, surrounding Kluang town were Lambak Estate, Mengkibol Estate, Kluang Estate, Coronation Estate,  Wessington Estate (now renamed as Simpang Renggam Estate), Benut Estate, Paloh Estate, Sepuloh Estate, Chamek Estate, Niyor Estate, Kahang Estate, Pamol Estate and Kekayaan Estate.

Among the rubber plantations, Lambak Estate is elaborately described in the book Malabar to Malaya written by Ravindran Raghavan who was born in this estate in 1965. The book gives a first-hand account of life in the estate and also provides statistics about wages earned by a rubber tapper family residing in the estate between 1977 to 1986.

Among the early Indian settlers who "migrated" here during the British era (they were considered as non-legitimate property owners at that time) were those who built some temples (although contrary against the British binding precedent) and the notable toddy shops in the surrounding areas of Kluang. Today you can find the remaining commercial elements in the "Little India" section of Kluang town. You can find "ONE" from a million interesting stories on the website containing the biography of Ravindran Raghavan, a native Kluang boy who grew in a rubber estate.

Rubber planting has over time transitioned to other types of crops. In the 1970s, rubber plantations were gradually replanted and replaced by oil palms. Kluang now boasts large tracts of oil palm plantations as well as cocoa and tea plantations. The former rubber plantation, Pamol Estate is now a high-performing palm oil plantation owned by IOI Corporation, considered one of the most efficient palm oil producers in the world. Pamol Estate has a total certified sustainable palm oil area of 12,044 hectares and a production of 56,528 tonnes.

Kluang has developed a diversified agricultural and organic farm sector. New kinds of plantation such as dragon fruit and organic vegetables have emerged. One of Malaysia's largest vegetable organic farms at over 100 acres, Zenxin Agri-Organic Food, is also located in Kluang. The Kluang Modern Agriculture Project (Projek Pertanian Moden Kluang) was officially launched in 2004 and covers over 9,000 acres. Within this project, there are herbal and grazing farms, including the largest goat and sheep farm, UK Agro Farm with over 4,000 heads of sheep and goat grazing over 100 acres. Further out in Kahang, within Kluang district, is the Kahang Organic Eco Rice Farm, the first certified organic rice farm in Malaysia.

Industry and commerce 

Kluang possesses a diverse industrial economy with sector-leading companies. From its early days as an entirely agricultural & horticulture economy, Kluang has developed various industries including polymer, paper, textiles, ceramics, industrial paints and electrical products.

Kluang is considered a "tile capital" of Malaysia. Leading companies such as MML (Malaysian Mosaics), French-based Terreal, Venus Ceramic and Guocera (subsidiary of Bursa Malaysia-listed Hong Leong Industries) house major factories in Kluang, contributing to Malaysia's position as a top 20 ceramic tile producer in the world.

There are a few multinational corporations operating in Kluang. Malaysia's largest tissue paper factory is owned and operated by Kimberly-Clark and is situated on the eastern industrial sector of the town. The Swiss-based conglomerate, Liebherr Group owns and operates a subsidiary, Liebherr Appliances which manufactures freezers and refrigerators for domestic consumption and export.

One of the world's largest nitrile production facilities is owned by Synthomer plc (listed in London FTSE). Synthomer is the new name of Yule Catto & Co Ltd. which traces its existence from pre-independence Malaya. Yule Catto merged with Malaya General Company Limited in 1971 and acquired Revertex Chemicals Ltd in 1980, inheriting the Revertex Estate and industrial complex in Kluang. The sprawling Kluang facility produced over 120,000 tons of nitrile latex out of an estimated worldwide production of 550,000 tons in 2010.

The commercial heart of Kluang lies downtown within the Kluang Inner Ring Road. The downtown district contains the shopping centres, restaurants and entertainment areas. All the major banks, brokerages and other financial institutions are all located in this area. Kluang is also the home of Hong Yuan Hills Crematorium, situated in Jalan Berlian 2, Taman Berlian.

Transport

Kluang is served by the national railway, the North–South Expressway and local trunk roads linking it to all neighbouring districts. The neighbouring airport is in Senai.

Car
The closest on-ramp to the PLUS Expressway is at exit 244 at Ayer Hitam although travellers approaching Kluang from the south (e.g. Johor Bahru etc.) may find exiting at Sedenak and Simpang Renggam are the options. 
Federal Route 50 begins in Batu Pahat, runs through downtown Kluang and continues on to Kahang, Jemaluang and ultimately Mersing on the eastern coast of Johor.

Rail
State railway operator KTMB has a station in Kluang, located at Jalan Stesen. The journey from Kuala Lumpur takes at least 5 hours. The station has a sheltered attached wooden cafeteria which is known as "Kluang Railcoffee", in operation since the 1938.

Bus
The Kluang express bus terminal is located at Jalan Bakawali. It is located next to Plaza BCB and Prime City Hotel. Express buses depart from this terminal to most cities in Peninsular Malaysia. There are daily buses to Kuala Lumpur (over 3 hours), Johor Bahru and various other cities throughout Peninsular Malaysia and also Singapore (Boon Lay) (over 2 hours).

 Kluang to Johor Bahru: KKKL and S&S International Online booking: S&S InternationalKKKL 
 Kluang to Kuala Lumpur: KKKL and S&S International. Online booking: KKKLBusOnlineTicketredBus
 Kluang to Singapore: Fivestar

Air
There is a military airfield  in Kluang. The air field is managed by the RMAF.

The nearest civilian airport is Senai International Airport (IATA:JHB), located in Senai, Kulai district, which is roughly 90 km south of Kluang or just over an hour's drive. Senai is also a hub for Air Asia's international destinations, mainly within regional south-east Asia.

Infrastructure 

Kluang is served by a district police station and a fire station.

Kluang Hospital is managed by the Ministry of Health and located in the southern part of the town. There also a KPJ Kluang Utama Specialist Hospital.

Education 
Sekolah Menengah Sains Johor (SMS Johor), was the first government boarding secondary school with a special emphasis on science subjects. It was founded in 1973 and currently has over 500 students.

Kluang High School or Sekolah Tinggi Kluang is one of the best known schools in Kluang and was founded in 1939. It now has over 1,500 students.

The Chong Hwa High School is the third biggest Chinese secondary school in Malaysia and was financially established by reputable Chinese settlers in the 1940s. The school enrolls over 3,000 students.

There also numbers of quite old schools such as SMK Jalan Mengkibol, SMK Tengku Aris Bedahara and SMK sultan Abdul Jalil.

A number of other schools were built between 2000 and 2006. Kluang also has a few small-scale institutes and technical colleges.

Famous Tamil school located at Jalan Haji Manan SRJK(T) Jalan Manan and one of the old Tamil school as SRJK(T) Ladang Pamol.

Tourism
Kluang is well known for its outdoor recreation and farms. The town is surrounded by farming districts, some of which have established eco resorts and tours. Among the most popular are Zenxin Organic Farm, possibly the largest vegetable farm in Peninsular Malaysia. There is farm tour, restaurant and convention hall. The organic supermarket is a favourite for tourists to buy local organic produce before heading home. Close by is UK Agro Farm which hosts Malaysia's largest goat and sheep farm. Tours featuring the animals are popular with children. At the other end of the district is Kahang Organic Rice Farm which also features agro-tourism in Malaysia's first organic padi field. Both UK Agro and Kahang Organic Rice Farm have basic chalet accommodation.

Gunung Belumut and Gunung Lambak are popular with jungle trekkers. The Gunung Lambak summit is 510m and can be reached within 2 hours without any equipment. It is popular on weekends with Kluang families.

Kluang is also famous for its coffee and this can be best experienced at Kluang RailCoffee at the Kluang Station. Established in 1938, the coffee shop still retains an old feel. It is best experienced during train arrival times, when disembarking passengers provides an atmosphere of days gone by. The most popular local delights are mee siam (traditional fried malay spicy rice noodles that wrapped with banana leaves & old news paper), half boiled eggs, variety of local coffee selections.

Also noteworthy is an authentic coffee shop located at no. 56, Jalan Lambak by the name of Tong Fong Cafe (a.k.a. Eastern Cafe) which was very popular with British soldiers when Malaysia was still under British rule. The operator is a second generation descendant of the owner and the coffee shop has been operating since 1954.

Like many secondary towns in Malaysia, Kluang also has its fair share of local food delights, with some touting Kluang beef noodles (Yean Kee) and the curry mee (Botak Curry Mee) as local favourites. Fresh seafood fare can be found at the Asam Pedas restaurant.

Shopping 

Shopping Centres:
 Kluang Mall (Pacific, MBO, Ampang Super Bowl, H&M, Uniqlo, Cotton On,  Starbucks, Coffee Bean, Secret Recipe, Sushi King, Oldtown, KFC, Pizza Hut, Big Apple, Sasa, GNC)
 Kluang Parade (Parkson, KFC, Old Taste, DVD shops and Target Supermarket.)

Hypermarkets, supermarkets & department stores:
 AEON BiG
 Econsave
 Songmart (Wet Market)
 Target Supermarket

Local foods:

 Chop Foo Chow Dim Sum (福州包店专卖店) 
 Yean Kee Beef Noodles (元记牛肉粉)
 Restoran Tangkak Beef Kluang
 Restoran Sin Hon Kee (新汉记牛猪肉丸)
 Kluang Rail Coffee (Jln Station, Kpg Masjid Lama 火车站咖啡店) 
 Gerai Makan Botak (摩達咖哩面)
 Yuen Fatt Biscuit (源发饼家)
 Ah Fu Satay @ Ah Fook Satay (阿福沙爹)
 Barney's Western Food, Kluang
 On The Road Cafe
 Sin Siang Kee Restaurant, Kluang (新香记肉骨茶)
 Tong Huat Confectionery (东发饼家)
 Restoran Chua Seng (泉成茶餐室) 
 Restoran Ikan Asam Pedas
 Restoran Heidi (凯迪西餐厅) 
 Star Coffee House & Restaurant, Kluang

Popular culture
Though not set in Kluang town itself, the 1990s Malaysian animation series Keluang Man shares the same namesake of the fruit bat or keluang.

Sister cities
   Kajang, Selangor, Malaysia
   Taiping, Perak, Malaysia

Notable people
 Samy Vellu, President of Malaysian Indian Congress  (MIC)(1979–2010), Minister of Works (1995–2008)
 Ali Hamsa, Chief Secretary to the Government
 Chieh Yuan (1945–1977),  Actor and martial artist
 Lee San Choon,  President of Malaysian Chinese Association  (MCA)(1975–1983)
 Ng Tian Hann, Malaysia Chinese Movie Director
 Shebby Singh, Malaysian former footballer
 Nur Izzuddin, badminton player

See also

 Kluang (federal constituency)
 Johor

References

External links

 Kluang KTM Railway Station
 KluangOnline Community

Kluang District
Towns in Johor